The 2006 Big 12 men's basketball tournament was the postseason men's basketball tournament for the Big 12 Conference. It was played from March 9 to 12 in Dallas, Texas at the American Airlines Center. Kansas won the tournament for the 4th time and received the conference's automatic bid to the 2006 NCAA tournament.

Seeding
The Tournament consisted of a 12 team single-elimination tournament with the top 4 seeds receiving a bye.

Schedule

Bracket

All-Tournament Team
Most Outstanding Player – Mario Chalmers, Kansas

See also
2006 Big 12 Conference women's basketball tournament
2006 NCAA Division I men's basketball tournament
2005–06 NCAA Division I men's basketball rankings

References

External links
Official 2006 Big 12 Men's Basketball Tournament Bracket

Big 12 men's basketball tournament
Tournament
Big 12 men's basketball tournament
Big 12 men's basketball tournament
Basketball in the Dallas–Fort Worth metroplex
College sports tournaments in Texas